Fedaiellidae  is an extinct family of fossil sea snails, marine gastropod mollusks in the clade Neritimorpha.

Distribution
Fossils of the genus Fedaiella are found in the marine strata of the Quaternary of Japan, the Paleocene of Poland and the Triassic of Italy.

References
Paleobiology Database

 
Prehistoric gastropods